Kolsh may refer to two villages in Albania:

Kolsh, Kukës, in the Kukës municipality
Kolsh, Lezhë, in the Lezhë municipality